Forty winks is an idiom meaning "to get some sleep"

Forty Winks or 40 Winks may also refer to:
 40 Winks (video game), a 1999 PlayStation video game
 Forty Winks (1925 film), a comedy silent film
 Forty Winks (1931 film), a film featuring Felix the Cat
 Forty Winks (play), a 2004 play by Kevin Elyot